Garb may refer to:

 Clothing
 Garb, a wheat sheaf (agriculture) in heraldry